Jeddah Club is a Saudi Arabian football team based in Jeddah that competes in the Prince Mohammad bin Salman League.

Current squad 

As of 20 September 2021:

References

Jeddah
Football clubs in Jeddah